Henry Maxwell, D.D. (1723–1798) was an Anglican clergyman who served in the Church of Ireland as the Dean of Kilmore, then Bishop of Dromore, and finally Bishop of Meath.

Early life and family
He was the youngest son of John Maxwell, 1st Baron Farnham and Judith Barry. In 1759, he married Margaret Foster, daughter of the Rt. Hon. Anthony Foster, and sister of John Foster, 1st Baron Oriel. Their two sons, John and Henry, succeeded as the 5th and 6th Baron Farnham.

Ecclesiastical career
He was ordained a priest in the Anglican ministry on 14 February 1748, and three years later instituted the Dean of Kilmore on 28 December 1751. He was nominated Bishop of Dromore by King George III on 8 February 1765 and appointed by letters patent on 5 March 1765. His consecration took place at St Michael's Church, Dublin on 10 March 1765, the principal consecrator was Archbishop Richard Robinson of Armagh, and the co-consecrators were Bishop Arthur Smyth of Meath and Bishop Jeremy Taylor of Down and Connor. The following year, he was translated by letters patent to the bishopric of Meath on 15 April 1766. He built the episcopal palace at Ardbraccan, and contributed liberally to the erection of the parish church. Having governed the see of Meath for thirty-two years, he died on 7 October 1798, aged 75, and was buried at Ardbraccan.

References

Bibliography

  
 

 
 
 
 
 
 
 
 
 
 
 

1723 births
1798 deaths
Anglican bishops of Dromore
Anglican bishops of Meath
Deans of Kilmore
Younger sons of barons